Don Fussell is an American computer scientist, currently the Trammell Crow Regents Professor at the University of Texas at Austin, and the chairman of its computer science department.

His research interests are in computer architecture, computer graphics, and computer systems. Dr. Fussell is the Director of the UT Laboratory for Realtime Graphics and Parallel Systems and an IC2 Fellow. He holds memberships with the Computer Engineering Research Center, Institute for Computational Engineering and Sciences, and the Department of Electrical and Computer Engineering. 

Don Fussell earned his Bachelor of Science from Dartmouth College, attending from 1969-1973, and the MS and PhD in Applied Mathematics from The University of Texas at Dallas in 1977 and 1980 respectively.

References

Year of birth missing (living people)
Living people
American computer scientists
University of Texas at Austin faculty